Michael Bischofer was an Austrian luger who competed from the late 1980s to the early 1990s. A natural track luger, he won the bronze medal in the men's doubles event at the 1992 FIL World Luge Natural Track Championships in Bad Goisern, Austria.

References
Natural track World Championships results: 1979-2007

Austrian male lugers
Living people
Year of birth missing (living people)